The 2012 United States Senate election in Indiana took place on November 6, 2012, concurrently with the U.S. presidential election as well as other elections to the United States Senate and House of Representatives and various state and local elections.

Incumbent Republican U.S. Senator Richard Lugar ran for reelection to a seventh term, but was defeated in the primary by Tea Party-backed Richard Mourdock. U.S. Representative Joe Donnelly, a Democrat from Indiana's 2nd congressional district, was unopposed in his party's primary, and then defeated both Mourdock and Libertarian Andrew Horning in the general election.

This election is also the most recent time a party would flip a Senate seat in a presidential election year without carrying the state in the concurrent presidential election.

Background and overview 
On November 7, 2006, incumbent Richard Lugar was unopposed by any major party candidate as no Democrat filed for the May 2006 primary. He was re-elected to his sixth six-year term with 87.3% of the vote. After the 2012 election, Lugar would have had an even chance, according to Senate Republican Conference rules, to be elected as its president pro tempore. However, the issue was rendered moot with Lugar's primary loss on May 9, 2012, as Indiana state law prohibits candidates from running for an election after losing a primary. Time featured the race in their "Fury of the Senate" article. The article mentioned how Donnelly was lucky that Mourdock won out in the primary against Lugar, a well-liked centrist member of the GOP. Another boost came when Mourdock's remarks regarding rape helped propel Donnelly to victory.

Republican primary 
The Republican primary was held on May 8, 2012.

Candidates

Declared 
 Richard Lugar, incumbent U.S. senator
 Richard Mourdock, state treasurer

Declined 
 Mike Delph, state senator
 Bob Thomas, auto dealer

Campaign 
Due to Lugar's unpopularity among some Tea Party voters because of his positions regarding illegal immigration, voting to confirm then-U.S. Supreme Court nominees Sonia Sotomayor and Elena Kagan, the DREAM Act, the New START Treaty, some gun control bills, and congressional earmarks, he was challenged by a Tea Party-backed candidate.

The Indiana Debate Commission's GOP primary debate with Sen. Richard Lugar and State Treasurer Richard Mourdock was set to air at 7 p.m. EDT on Wednesday, April 11. In a widely published poll taken March 26 to 28, Lugar was still in the lead, but by the time of a second published poll from April 30 to May 1, Mourdock was leading 48% to 38%.

Mourdock defeated Senator Lugar in the Republican primary on May 8, 2012.

According to Indiana law, Lugar's defeat meant that he would not be permitted to run in the election either as a third party or an independent candidate after he lost the primary.

Endorsements

Polling

Results

Democratic primary

Candidates

Declared 
 Joe Donnelly, U.S. Representative

Declined 
 Brad Ellsworth, former U.S. Representative and nominee for the U.S. Senate in 2010
 Baron Hill, former U.S. Representative

Results 
Donnelly was unopposed for the Democratic nomination.

General election

Candidates 
 Joe Donnelly (D), U.S. Representative
 Andrew Horning (L), product manager and nominee for governor in 2008
 Richard Mourdock (R), Indiana State Treasurer

Debates 
Confirmed debates with Donnelly, Horning and Mourdock are:

Date: Monday, October 15
Broadcast Time: 7 p.m. EDT
City: Indianapolis
Venue: WFYI-TV (in studio/no live audience)
Complete video of debate, October 15, 2012 - C-SPAN

Date: Tuesday, October 23
Broadcast Time: 7 p.m. EDT
City: New Albany
Venue: Paul W. Ogle Cultural & Community Center, Indiana University Southeast (live audience – seating up to 500)
Complete video of debate, October 23, 2012 - C-SPAN

Fundraising

Top contributors

Top industries

Campaign

Pregnancy from rape controversy 

Mourdock became embroiled in a controversy after stating that pregnancy from rape is "something that God intended". His remarks were made during a debate on October 23, 2012, while explaining his opposition to abortion even in the case of rape. At the debate Mourdock, when asked what his position on abortion was, responded:

I know there are some who disagree and I respect their point of view but I believe that life begins at conception. The only exception I have to have an abortion is in that case of the life of the mother. I just struggled with it myself for a long time but I came to realize: "Life is that gift from God that I think even if life begins in that horrible situation of rape, that it is something that God intended to happen".

Media speculated that this could affect the outcome of the Senate race and Presidential race and multiple sources noted the similarities with the rape and pregnancy statement controversies in the 2012 United States elections.

Responding to the criticism, Mourdock issued a statement saying: "God creates life, and that was my point. God does not want rape, and by no means was I suggesting that he does. Rape is a horrible thing, and for anyone to twist my words otherwise is absurd and sick." He was later quoted at a press conference also saying: "I believe God controls the universe. I don't believe biology works in an uncontrolled fashion." He however refused to issue an apology, even while prominent Republicans, including Sen. John McCain, called for him to do so.

Response 
A day before the controversy started, a television ad began airing that showed Governor Mitt Romney, the Republican nominee for United States President, supporting Mourdock. The Romney campaign subsequently issued a statement saying "Gov. Romney disagrees with Richard Mourdock's comments, and they do not reflect his views," but did not pull the ad. Senator John Cornyn, chairman of the National Republican Senatorial Committee, said "Richard and I, along with millions of Americans—including even Joe Donnelly—believe that life is a gift from God. To try and construe his words as anything other than a restatement of that belief is irresponsible and ridiculous".

Many public Republicans called for Mourdock to apologize for the statement. Sen. John McCain called for him to issue an apology and his support "depends on what he does." Senator Scott Brown refused to state that he supported Mourdock in the election. Rep. Mike Pence, a Republican running for governor of Indiana concurrent to Mourdock's senatorial campaign, urged Mourdock to apologize. "I strongly disagree with the statement made by Richard Mourdock during last night's Senate debate," he said in a statement. "I urge him to apologize."

President Obama stated, "Rape is rape. It is a crime," on the Tonight Show. He continued, "These various distinctions about rape don't make too much sense to me." Dan Parker, chairman of the Indiana Democratic Party, immediately criticized Mourdock, saying: "I'm stunned and ashamed that Richard Mourdock believes God intended rape", and claimed that he is an "extremist" who is out of touch with Indiana.

Predictions

Polling 

with Richard Lugar

Results 
On election night, Donnelly won by about six percent. Donnelly performed well in Marion County, home of Indianapolis. Donnelly also won areas with major college campuses, such as Indiana University in Bloomington, Purdue University in Lafayette. Mourdock performed well, as expected in the Indianapolis suburbs, such as Hamilton County. Mourdock conceded defeat to Donnelly at around 11:30 p.m. EST.

By congressional district
Donnelly won 5 of 9 congressional districts, including three held by Republicans.

See also 
 2012 United States Senate elections
 2012 United States House of Representatives elections in Indiana
 2012 Indiana gubernatorial election
 Politics of the United States
 Federal government of the United States

Notes

References

External links 
 Indiana Secretary of State
 Campaign contributions at OpenSecrets.org
 Outside spending at Sunlight Foundation
 Candidate issue positions at On the Issues

Official campaign websites
 Joe Donnelly for U.S. Senate
 Richard Mourdock for U.S. Senate
 Andrew Horning for U.S. Senate

2012
Indiana
Senate